Ryan Lee Moore (born 18 September 1983) is an English flat racing jockey, who was Champion Jockey in 2006, 2008 and 2009. He is currently the first choice jockey for Aidan O'Brien's Ballydoyle operation, a role in which he mainly rides horses owned by Coolmore Stud. He also sometimes rides horses for Juddmonte and The Queen.

Family

Moore is the son of successful trainer and former jump jockey Gary L. Moore, and brother to jump jockeys Jamie Moore and Joshua Moore, and top amateur jockey Hayley Moore. He has four children.

He is the grandson of trainer Charlie Moore, a well-known character who lived around the corner from Brighton Racecourse. Charlie was also a second-hand car salesman, and many stories have circulated about his dual career, including how he swapped three truck tyres in exchange for a filly, and how he started training when he accidentally bought a horse by raising his hand at auction. He is also close to Gary's sister, his aunt Candy, who is also a jockey.

Moore considers himself the laziest of the family.

Career

Moore starting riding at four, having lessons at his grandad's and with the pony club. However, he didn't enjoy cross country and showjumping, finding it a "bit tame" when he wanted to be doing competitive racing instead. National Hunt jockey AP McCoy rode for Moore's father when in his teens and Moore, aged 12, led him over hurdles as they schooled horses. Moore was influenced by his drive and dedication. "He wanted to ride everything in the yard. His work ethic was huge," he told an interviewer.

Unlike his siblings, who knew from an early age that they wanted to race, this wasn't always clear to Moore. Football was another passion, and he had trials with Brighton and Hove Albion.

Moore's first wins came as a 16-year-old, which is when he decided to take up racing as a career, although his mother Jayne tried to persuade him to stay at school and complete his A-levels believing he wouldn't make it in racing. At one point, he too did not consider himself good enough. During his A-levels, he was taking days off to ride, but this only lasted one term before he gave up.

Moore rode winners for his grandad before the latter died in 2000. "I was close to him and won a couple of races before he died in 2000. I like to think it made him happy, that it brought him something at the end of his life. I'm glad he saw it." At 16, he weighed 8st 10 lb, but by the time he became champion apprentice he had to get down to 7st 13 lb.

Richard Hannon

Moore's first mentor was Richard Hannon, a trainer for whom he would still be winning big races when Hannon retired in 2013. He was sent to Hannon by his father. At the end of his first full season, he won the Cesarewitch Handicap and had Group race experience.

His first major victory came for a different trainer, though, when he won the 2002 Cesarewitch Handicap for Martin Pipe on Miss Fara on 19 October 2002. He got his first black type victory later that same year when winning the Listed Jebel Ali Stakes in the United Arab Emirates shortly after Christmas 2002. He didn't score any major victories in 2003, and had a strike rate of under 10%, but it was enough for him to become Champion Apprentice.

2004 saw him top 100 winners and £1 million in prize money for the first time and on 29 August, he won his first group race, the Group 3 Prestige Stakes at Goodwood. For Hannon, he then won his first Group 2 race, taking the Mill Reef Stakes on Galleota in September.

Sir Michael Stoute

Increasingly, Moore rode for Sir Michael Stoute, sharing those duties with Kerrin McEvoy, Mick Kinane and others after Kieren Fallon quit as stable jockey to ride for Aidan O'Brien. It was for Stoute he had his first Group 1 win, on Notnowcato in the Juddmonte International at York in August 2006. That year he won his first jockeys' title which came as a surprise to him. He had said that the odds of 8/1 on him becoming champion at the start of the season were too generous, but he had expected to finish third. Commentators were suggesting that his "resilience and iron will should turn Moore into one of racing's iconic figures." 
In 2006, he was riding at 8st 5 lb most days.

In 2007, he rode Notnowcato to victory in the Tattersalls Gold Cup in Ireland, and in the Eclipse. For the latter race, Moore took the horse down the stands side, while the remainder of the field including odds-on favourite and Derby winner Authorized and George Washington raced on the other side of the track.

In that year, Stoute horses gave him 47 of his 126 wins, overtaking Hannon (33 winners) as his primary stable. Moore spent three months injured during the season, preventing him from retaining his title, but a late season crop of victories meant he still finished third in the jockeys table.

These efforts were rewarded when he was offered the job as stable jockey at the end of the 2007 season, while he was in Tokyo, riding Papal Bull in the Japan Cup. Hannon meanwhile would make more use of his son-in-law Richard Hughes (jockey), after his retainer with Khaled Abdullah came to an end. Moore would later say of Stoute, "he's just a very clever man - an unbelievable brain."
 
On the Thursday of Glorious Goodwood in 2007, Moore won four races, including the Goodwood Cup on Allegretto.
 It is thought he would have won the 2007 jockeys' championship if he hadn't broken his arm in a fall. He would win it again in 2008.

In April 2009, he rode winners at Sandown Park, Sha Tin in Hong Kong, and Windsor on consecutive days, the 36-hour trip to the Far East winning him nearly £50,000 after he won the Queen Elizabeth II Cup on Presvis, trained by Luca Cumani. That summer, he won the King George VI and Queen Elizabeth Stakes on Conduit for Stoute. The first three, all trained by Stoute, came together, leading to a steward's inquiry, but Conduit kept the result.

Over the course of 2009 and 2010, he swept the big races of the world. He won at the Breeders' Cup in the autumn after sealing a third jockeys' title. Then he won the 2010 Derby on Workforce in a course record time, and the Oaks on consecutive days. He crowned the year with another win on Workforce in the Prix de l'Arc de Triomphe. A broken wrist cost him another chance at the jockeys' title, but he was already being spoken of as an all-time great by some commentators. Former jockey Willie Carson suggested he could be as good as Lester Piggott and predicted he would recapture the jockeys' title in 2011.

However, his attention was beginning to shift from pursuing the title, to concentrating on fewer, bigger races instead. He clarified that with a family, he was no longer keen to travel the country in pursuit of another title. He said, "The big races are becoming a massive draw for me. That's the way it has happened with a lot of top jockeys... I understand why Frankie [Dettori] competes in fewer races. It's understandable, with our schedule." His chances of winning the title took a blow in any case, when he missed two months after injuring himself at Goodwood in July.

He was now riding for several celebrity owners. He rode for many of the Manchester United team including Michael Owen, Paul Scholes, Ashley Cole and manager Alex Ferguson. Moore also rode the Queen's Carlton House to victory in the Dante Stakes at York Racecourse and then to a close 3rd in the Epsom Derby. He finished 2011 by winning a Japanese Grade One on Snow Fairy for the second year running.

Aidan O'Brien

O'Brien was rumoured to be lining up Moore as stable jockey from November 2011. Moore was keen on the job, but reluctant to move his family from Newmarket to County Tipperary. They negotiated a compromise that allowed Moore to live in England, while riding for O'Brien in Ireland at the major meetings.

Instead, O'Brien's son Joseph became the main rider for Ballydoyle. Moore rode for O'Brien when the trainer had multiple runners. In that way he won the 2012 1,000 Guineas on Homecoming Queen and the 2013 Derby on Ruler Of The World.

He finished fourth in the jockeys' championship of 2012, and runner-up in 2013, behind Richard Hughes.
He again finished runner-up in the jockeys' championship of 2014.

By 2015, Joseph O'Brien, at nearly 6 ft tall, was struggling to make the weight to ride in the major races and his father Aidan needed a replacement. In April, it was confirmed that Moore would ride Ballydoyle's runners in the Classics and other significant races. O'Brien explained the arrangement thus: "Ryan will be riding our main horses this year and Joseph will be riding other horses when the weights allow him to. Seamie Heffernan and Colm O’Donoghue will also be involved as in the past."

By the end of the 2017 season, Moore had won over 2,000 races in Britain, the third most of all active jockeys, behind only Frankie Dettori and Joe Fanning, both of whom had been riding for a decade longer.

Statistics

Flat wins in Great Britain by year

Major wins
 Great Britain
 1000 Guineas – (4) – Homecoming Queen (2012), Legatissimo (2015), Minding (2016) Love (2020)
 2000 Guineas - (2) - Gleneagles (2015), Churchill (2017)
 Ascot Gold Cup - (3) - Estimate (2013), Order of St George (2016), Kyprios (2022)
 British Champions Fillies and Mares Stakes - (1) - Hydrangea (2017)
 Cheveley Park Stakes - (2) - Clemmie (2017), Tenebrism (2021)
 Commonwealth Cup - (1) - Caravaggio (2017)
 Coronation Cup - (3) - Ask (2009), St Nicholas Abbey (2011), Highland Reel (2017)
 Coronation Stakes - (2) - Rizeena (2014), Winter (2017)
 Derby Stakes - (2) - Workforce (2010), Ruler of the World (2013)
 Dewhurst Stakes - (4) - Beethoven (2009), Air Force Blue (2015), Churchill (2016), U S Navy Flag (2017)
 Diamond Jubilee Stakes - (3) - Twilight Son (2016), Merchant Navy (2018), Dream of Dreams (2021)
 Eclipse Stakes - (2) - Notnowcato (2007), St Mark's Basilica (2021)
 Falmouth Stakes - (3) - Integral (2014), Alice Springs (2016), Roly Poly (2017)
 Fillies' Mile - (2) - Minding (2015), Rhododendron (2016)
 International Stakes - (2) - Notnowcato (2006), Japan (2019)
 Goodwood Cup - (1)  Kyprios (2022) 
 July Cup - (2) - U S Navy Flag (2018), Ten Sovereigns (2019)
 King George VI and Queen Elizabeth Stakes - (2) - Conduit (2009), Highland Reel (2016)
 Lockinge Stakes - (1) - Rhododendron (2018)
 Oaks - (4) - Snow Fairy (2010), Minding (2016), Love (2020), Tuesday (2022)
 Nassau Stakes - (3) - Minding (2016), Winter (2017), Fancy Blue (2020)
 Middle Park Stakes - (1) -  Blackbeard (2022) 
 Prince of Wales's Stakes - (2) - Highland Reel (2017), Love (2021)
 Queen Anne Stakes - (1) - Circus Maximus (2020)
 Queen Elizabeth II Stakes - (1) - Minding (2016)
 Vertem Futurity Trophy - (3) - Saxon Warrior (2017), Luxembourg (2021), Auguste Rodin (2022)
 St James's Palace Stakes - (2) - Gleneagles (2015), Circus Maximus (2019)
 St Leger Stakes - (2) - Capri (2017), Kew Gardens (2018)
 Sun Chariot Stakes - (3) - Integral (2014), Alice Springs (2016), Roly Poly (2017)
 Sussex Stakes - (1) - The Gurkha (2016)
 Yorkshire Oaks - (3) - Tapestry (2014), Love (2020), Snowfall (2021)

 Australia
 Cox Plate - (1) - Adelaide (2014)
 Golden Slipper - (1) - Shinzo (2023)
 Mackinnon Stakes - (1) - Magic Wand (2019)
 Melbourne Cup - (1) - Protectionist (2014)
 Ranvet Stakes - (1) - Dubai Honour (2023) 

 Canada
 Canadian International Stakes - (3) - Joshua Tree (2013), Hillstar (2014), Cannock Chase (2015)
 E. P. Taylor Stakes - (1) - Curvy (2015)

 France
 Critérium International - (1) - Johannes Vermeer (2015)
 Grand Prix de Paris - (2) - Kew Gardens (2018), Japan (2019)
 Grand Prix de Saint-Cloud - (2) - Spanish Moon (2009), Novellist (2013)
 Poule d'Essai des Poulains - (1) - The Gurkha (2016)
 Prix de l'Arc de Triomphe - (2) - Workforce (2010), Found (2016)
 Prix du Cadran - (2) - High Jinx (2014), Kyprios (2022) 
 Prix Jean Prat - (1) -  Tenebrism (2022) 
 Prix du Jockey-Club - (1) - The Grey Gatsby (2014)
 Prix du Moulin - (1) - Circus Maximus (2019)
 Prix Jean-Luc Lagardère - (1) - Happily (2017)
 Prix Marcel Boussac - (2) - Found (2014), Ballydoyle (2015) 
 Prix Maurice de Gheest - (1) - King's Apostle (2009)
 Prix Morny - (1)  Blackbeard (2022) 
 Prix Rothschild - (2) - Roly Poly (2017), Mother Earth (2021)
 Prix Royal-Oak - (2) - Allegretto (2007), Ask (2009)
 Prix Saint-Alary - (1) -  Above The Curve (2022) 

 Germany
 Bayerisches Zuchtrennen - (1) - Linngari (2008)

 Hong Kong
 Hong Kong Classic Cup - (1) - Sun Jewellery (2016)
 Hong Kong Classic Mile - (1) - Sun Jewellery (2016)
 Hong Kong Derby - (1) - Ping Hai Star (2018)
 Hong Kong Cup - (2) - Snow Fairy (2010), Maurice (2016)
 Hong Kong Mile - (1) - Maurice (2015)
 Hong Kong Sprint - (2) -  Danon Smash (2020) , Wellington (2022)
 Hong Kong Vase - (3) - Highland Reel (2015, 2017), Mogul (2020)
 Queen Elizabeth II Cup - (1) - Presvis (2009)

 Ireland
 Irish 1,000 Guineas - (3) - Marvellous (2014), Winter (2017), Hermosa (2019)
 Irish 2,000 Guineas - (2) - Gleneagles (2015), Churchill (2017)
 Irish Champion Stakes - (4) - The Grey Gatsby (2014), Magical (2019), St Mark's Basilica (2021),Luxembourg (2022) 
 Irish Oaks - (2) - Snow Fairy (2010), Snowfall (2021)
 Irish St Leger - (3) - Order of St George (2017), Flag of Honour (2018),Kyprios (2022) 
 Matron Stakes - (2) - Echelon (2007), Alice Springs (2016)
 Phoenix Stakes - (2) - Sioux Nation (2017), Little Big Bear (2022)
 Pretty Polly Stakes - (2) - Promising Lead (2008), Minding (2016)
 Tattersalls Gold Cup - (2) - So You Think (2011), Magical (2019)
 Moyglare Stud Stakes - (2) - Love (2019), Shale (2020)
 Flying Five Stakes - (1) - Fairyland (2019)
 Vincent O'Brien National Stakes - (1) - Churchill (2016)

 Italy
 Gran Criterium - (1) - Scintillo (2007)

 Japan
 Asahi Hai Futurity Stakes - (2) - Asia Express (2013), Salios (2019)
 Champions Cup - (1) -Gold Dream (2017)
 Japan Cup - (2) - Gentildonna (2013), Vela Azul (2022)
 Mile Championship - (1) - Maurice (2015)
 Queen Elizabeth II Commemorative Cup - (2) - Snow Fairy (2010, 2011)
 Tenno Sho - (1) - Maurice (2016)

 United Arab Emirates
 Dubai Turf - (2) - Presvis (2011), Real Steel (2016)
 Dubai Sheema Classic - (1) - Gentildonna (2014)
 Al Quoz Sprint - (1) - Extravagant Kid (2021)	
 Jebel Hatta - (1) - Presvis (2010)

 United States
 Belmont Derby - (1) Bolshoi Ballet (2021) 
 Belmont Oaks - (2) - Athena (2018), Santa Barbara (2021)
 Beverly D. Stakes - (3) - Dank (2013), Euro Charline (2014), Santa Barbara (2021)
 Breeders' Cup Filly and Mare Turf  - (2) - Dank (2013),Tuesday (2022)  
 Breeders' Cup Juvenile Fillies Turf - (1) - Meditate (2022)
 Breeders' Cup Juvenile Turf - (5) - Wrote (2011), George Vancouver (2012), Hit It A Bomb (2015), Mendelssohn (2017), Victoria Road (2022)
 Breeders' Cup Turf - (4) - Conduit (2008, 2009), Magician (2013), Found (2015)
 Secretariat Stakes - (1) - Adelaide (2014)

Year-end charts in the United States

See also
List of jockeys

References

External links
Racingbase.com - Racing People: Ryan Moore
back-strait.com - Jockey Profiles: Ryan Moore Jockey Profile
Ryan Moore at the NTRA

1983 births
Living people
Sportspeople from Brighton
English jockeys
Lester Award winners
British Champion flat jockeys
British Champion apprentice jockeys